Sharon L. Lechter (born January 12, 1954) is an American accountant, author, and businesswoman. She is the co-author of Rich Dad Poor Dad, and the founder and CEO of Pay Your Family First, a financial education organization.

In January 2008, Lechter was appointed to the President's Advisory Council on Financial Literacy to serve a two-year term.

Personal life
Lechter graduated from Florida State University with an Accounting degree in 1979, then worked briefly for a small accounting firm, "Big Eight". She met her husband, Michael Lechter, in 1980. Subsequently, the Lechters met Robert Kiyosaki and, together, formed the Rich Dad companies. Lechter has stated that she held various management positions with unnamed computer, insurance and publishing companies, while maintaining her credentials as a professional CPA.

In 1997, Lechter co-authored the book Rich Dad Poor Dad, along with 14 other books in the Rich Dad series, and was CEO of the Rich Dad company for over 10 years. She also annotated Outwitting the Devil (1938), in cooperation with the Napoleon Hill Foundation, and co-authored its publication, Three Feet from Gold.

Pay Your Family First
In 2007 Lechter created Pay Your Family First, a financial literacy education company.

Lawsuit
On October 12, 2007, Lechter filed suit against Rich Dad, Poor Dad co-author Robert Kiyosaki in Clark County, NV (Civil Case # 07-A-549886-C). On September 4, 2008, the Lechters and Kiyosakis reached a settlement in their lawsuit.

Council on Financial Literacy 
In January 2008, George W. Bush appointed Lechter to the President's Council on Financial Literacy (succeeded by the President's Advisory Council on Financial Capability during the Obama Administration).

Recognitions 
Woman of the Year (2013)- National Bank of Arizona honored Sharon with this award
Positively Powerful Woman Award for Philanthropic Leadership (2012)
2016 Edgewater High School Hall of Fame. (Class of 1972)

 Publications 
Rich Dad Series

Warner Bros./Hachette Publishing – Sharon Lechter as co-author with Robert Kiyosaki:Rich Dad, Poor Dad (1997)Rich Dad's CASHFLOW Quadrant (1998)Rich Dad's Guide to Investing (2000)Rich Dad's Rich Kid Smart Kid (2001)Rich Dad's Retire Young Retire Rich (2001)Rich Dad's Prophecy (2002)Rich Dad's Success Stories (2003)Rich Dad's Guide to Becoming Rich Without Cutting Up Your Credit Cards (2003)Rich Dad's Who Took My Money (2004)Rich Dad's Before You Quit Your Job (2005)

Sharon Lechter as author with co-author Garrett Sutton:Rich Dad's Real Estate Advantages (2006)

Little Brown/Hachette Publishing – Sharon Lechter as co-author with Robert Kiyosaki:Rich Dad Poor Dad for Teens (2004)Escape the Rat Race (2005)

VideoPlus – Sharon Lechter as co-author with Robert Kiyosaki:The Business School For People Who Like Helping People (2001)

Rich Publishing – Donald Trump and Robert Kiyosaki with Sharon Lechter and Meredith McIver as co-authors:Why We Want You to be Rich (2006)Rich Woman (2006) – Kim Kiyosaki''

Rich Dad Advisor Series
Warner Bros./Hachette 
Sales Dogs (2001)
Own Your Own Corporation (2001)
Protecting Your #1 Asset (2001)
How to Buy and Sell a Business (2003)
OPM – Other People's Money (2004)
The ABC's of Real Estate Investing (2004)
The ABC's of Getting Out of Debt (2004)
The ABC's of Writing Winning Business Plans (2005)
The ABC's of Building a Business Team That Wins (2006)

References

External links 
 
 

1954 births
Living people
American accountants
Women accountants
American business writers
Women business writers
American chief executives of education-related organizations
American columnists
American education writers
American finance and investment writers
American financial literacy activists
American investors
American motivational speakers
Women motivational speakers
Women motivational writers
American real estate businesspeople
American self-help writers
American women chief executives
Business educators
Businesspeople from Arizona
Edgewater High School alumni
Florida State University alumni
People associated with direct selling
American women investors
American women columnists
21st-century American businesswomen
21st-century American businesspeople